The lophophore is a characteristic feeding organ possessed by four major groups of animals: the Brachiopoda, Bryozoa, Hyolitha, and Phoronida, which collectively constitute the protostome group Lophophorata. All lophophores are found in aquatic organisms.

Etymology
Lophophore is derived from the Greek lophos (crest, tuft) and -phore, -phoros (φορος) (bearing), a derivative of phérein (φέρειν) (to bear); thus crest-bearing.

Characteristics
The lophophore can most easily be described as a ring of ciliated tentacles surrounding the mouth, but it is often horseshoe-shaped or coiled. Phoronids have their lophophores in plain view, but the valves of brachiopods must be opened wide to get a good view of their lophophore.

The lophophore surrounds the mouth and is an upstream collecting system for suspension feeding. Its tentacles are hollow, with extensions of a coelomic space thought to be a mesocoel. The gut is U-shaped with the anterior mouth at the center of the lophophore. The anus, where present, is also anterior, but is dorsal to the mouth. In the Bryozoa, it is outside the ring of the lophophore. The inarticulate brachiopods do not have an anus.

Classification of lophophorates
Groups with lophophores are called lophophorates. In the old view of metazoan phylogeny, the lophophorates were placed within the Deuterostomia. Now, they have been reassessed and placed in a new superphylum known as the Lophotrochozoa in the Protostomia, which includes the Mollusca and Annelida.

The extinct hederelloids, microconchids, cornulitids, and tentaculitids were likely lophophorates based on their biomineralization.

The position of the Hyolitha has long been disputed, but as of 2017, it has been assigned to the Lophophorata as finely-preserved specimens in the Burgess Shale can be seen to carry lophophores. Lophophorates did appear paraphyletic, but that is contested.

References

Protostome anatomy